Fleur-de-Lis Platform railway station served the village of Fleur-de-lis, in the historical county of Glamorganshire, Wales, from 1926 to 1962 on the Rumney Railway.

History 
The station was opened on 29 March 1926 by the Great Western Railway. It closed on 31 December 1962.

References 

Former Great Western Railway stations
Railway stations in Great Britain opened in 1926
Railway stations in Great Britain closed in 1962
1926 establishments in Wales
1962 disestablishments in Wales